The 1944 New York state election was held on November 7, 1944, to elect a judge of the New York Court of Appeals and a U.S. senator, as well as all members of the New York State Assembly and the New York State Senate.

Nominations
The Socialist Labor state convention met on April 2 at the Cornish Arms Hotel, the corner of Eighth Avenue and Twenty-eighth Street, in New York City. They nominated Eric Hass for the U.S. Senate; and Walter Steinhilber, a "commercial artist," for the Court of Appeals. At that time, the party used the name "Industrial Government Party" on the ballot, but was also referred to as the "Industrial Labor Party".

The Liberal Party was organized by a state convention with about 1,100 delegates who met on May 19 and 20 at the Roosevelt Hotel in New York City. They endorsed the incumbent Democratic U.S. Senator Robert F. Wagner for re-election. The party filed a petition to nominate candidates which was allowed by Secretary of State Curran on August 25.

The Republican State Committee met on August 8 at Albany, New York. They nominated Secretary of State Thomas J. Curran for the U.S. Senate; and Supreme Court justice John Van Voorhis for the Court of Appeals.

The Democratic State Committee met on August 8 at the National Democratic Club at 233, Madison Avenue in New York City. They re-nominated the incumbent U.S. Senator Robert F. Wagner; and nominated Court of Claims judge Marvin R. Dye for the Court of Appeals.

The American Labor state convention met on August 10. They endorsed the Democratic nominees Wagner and Dye.

Result
The Democratic/American Labor/Liberal ticket was elected. The incumbent Wagner was re-elected.

References

See also
New York state elections
1944 United States presidential election

1944
 
New York